Leslie Richard McKeown (12 November 195520 April 2021) was a Scottish pop singer. He was the lead singer of the Bay City Rollers during their most successful period in the 1970s.

Early life
McKeown was born in Broomhouse, a suburb close to the south-western city limit of Edinburgh, on 12 November 1955. His father, Francis, worked as a tailor and was deaf; his mother, Florence (née Close), was a seamstress who moved to Scotland after getting married. Both emigrated to the United Kingdom from Ireland. The family communicated with his father via hand signals. McKeown was raised in a city tenement block, attended Broomhouse Primary School, then nearby Forrester High School, and volunteered in the Boys' Brigade. He left school at 15 and became a member of the band Threshold. He was employed at a paper mill in between the group's gigs, which earned them £20 per show. In his autobiography, Shang-a-Lang: Life as an International Pop Idol (2003), he admits he had a happy childhood in Broomhouse, but Edinburgh, in his view a drab place to live, became a place to escape from. Among the core members of the band, McKeown was the only one, after the band ran its course, who did not go back to live in Scotland.

Career
McKeown joined the Bay City Rollers in November 1973, replacing founding lead singer Gordon "Nobby" Clark. He was initially reluctant to join the group, later stating in his memoir that it was not "high on my list of bands I'd have wanted to join". The band only achieved national, and then international, popularity after McKeown joined. That said, the locally well-known band, with a recording contract with a minor label, was already established and the newly recruited singer, in his autobiography, maintains that there always was a chasm between him and the rest of the band, despite the fact they were of, more or less, the same age and shared similar backgrounds.  The rest of the band members were all from Craigmillar/Liberton, suburbs of similar character to Broomhouse, but near to the southern border of the city, and as the subtitle of his autobiography suggests, McKeown had no pretension to be a rock musician/artist unlike some members of the band. 

His arrival also coincided with an overhaul of the group's image introducing half-mast trousers, platform shoes and tartan. They had four songs in the Top 10 in 1974 ("Remember", "Summerlove Sensation", "All of Me Loves All of You", and "Shang-a-Lang" which featured McKeown as the frontman). This was followed by 2 UK number ones ("Bye Bye Baby", "Give a Little Love") and a U.S. number one ("Saturday Night", which was re-recorded with McKeown as the lead vocalist) a year later. 

Their manager Tam Paton, who was concerned about the inadequacy of the band's musical capabilities, apart from McKeown's singing talent and good looks, chose songs for them and hired song writers and competent studio musicians for the recordings. As a result, often in the Bay City Rollers' recordings, McKeown's vocals were the only musical contributions from the band.

McKeown later wrote that he was raped by Paton and that Paton provided him with Mandrax and amphetamines to help him cope with the pressures of touring.

McKeown left the group in 1978 as its popularity began to decline. He established the pop band Egotrip and released a solo album in 1979 titled All Washed Up, which was successful in Japan. He went on to release eight more solo albums. He rejoined the Bay City Rollers in 2015 for a series of reunion shows, the first of which, at Glasgow's Barrowlands, sold out in three minutes. He released his final album, The Lost Songs, in 2016.

McKeown killed an elderly neighbour in 1975 as a result of reckless driving, for which he was banned from driving for one year and fined £100. He later revealed how the guilt he felt over the event played a key role in his alcoholism. He was fined and banned from driving for 18 months after another incident in 2015 when driving while drunk.

Personal life and death
McKeown married Peko Keiko, a native of Japan, in 1983. They had a son. In 2008, McKeown stayed at a treatment facility in California for four months, successfully overcoming his addiction to alcohol. One year later, in the Living TV show Rehab, covering celebrities fighting addiction, he disclosed that he was a "secret bisexual" and admitted being unfaithful to his wife with both men and women.

McKeown died on 20 April 2021, at the age of 65, after going into cardiac arrest at his home in London. A coroner's report concluded that his death was from "a combination of natural causes"; he had cardiovascular disease and hypertension, at least partially caused by years of drug and alcohol abuse.

Discography

Bay City Rollers albums 

 1974 – Rollin'
 1975 – Once Upon a Star
 1975 – Bay City Rollers
 1975 – Wouldn't You Like It?
 1976 – Rock n' Roll Love Letter
 1976 – Dedication
 1977 – It's a Game
 1978 – Strangers in the Wind

Solo albums 

 1979 – All Washed Up
 1980 – The Face of Love
 1980 – 100% Live
 1980 – The Greatest
 1981 – Sweet Pain
 1982 – Heart Control
 1989 – It's a Game
 1993 – Love Letter
 2016 – The Lost Songs

Bibliography
 {{cite book |first1=Les |last1=McKeown |first2=Lynne |last2=Elliott |first3=Irvine |last3=Welsh |author3-link=Irvine Welsh |title=Shang-a-lang: Life as an International Pop Idol |url= https://www.google.co.uk/books/edition/Shang_a_lang/hsu2NwAACAAJ?hl=en |year=2003 |isbn=1-84018-651-8}}

References

Sources
 Stambler, Irwin, Encyclopedia of Pop, Rock & Soul''. 1974. St. Martin's Press, Inc., New York, N.Y.

External links
 Official website
  as Les McKeown
  as Leslie McKeown
 

1955 births
2021 deaths
20th-century Scottish LGBT people
20th-century Scottish male singers
21st-century Scottish LGBT people
Bay City Rollers members
Bisexual singers
British pop rock singers
Deaths from hypertension
Hansa Records artists
Scottish LGBT singers
Musicians from Edinburgh
Scottish memoirists
Scottish people of Irish descent
Scottish people of Northern Ireland descent
Scottish pop singers
Scottish rock singers